Taylor Darling (born November 21, 1983) is a member of the New York State Assembly, representing the 18th district, which includes portions of the town of Hempstead in Nassau County on Long Island. A Democrat, Darling was first elected in 2018, defeating thirty-year incumbent Earlene Hooper in the primary election.

Darling was born in Brooklyn, and spent time growing up throughout Europe while her father was serving in the military. An avid chess player, Darling was nationally ranked as a youth.  She enrolled in Spelman College at the age of 16, and was accepted into a psychology doctoral program at age 19 attending Hofstra University.

In 2018, Darling decided to challenge thirty-year incumbent Assemblywoman Earlene Hooper in the Democratic primary.  While she was considered the underdog, Hooper failed to mount a strong campaign. As a result, Darling defeated Hooper 54% to 46% to win the nomination.  She  won the general election.

She currently resides in Hempstead, New York, with her family.

References

External links 

 New York Assemblywoman Taylor Darling (D-Hempstead)

1983 births
Living people
Politicians from Brooklyn
People from Hempstead (village), New York
Spelman College alumni
Hofstra University alumni
Democratic Party members of the New York State Assembly
21st-century American women politicians
21st-century American politicians
Women state legislators in New York (state)